The boa knot is a modern  binding knot invented by weaver Peter Collingwood in 1996.  His intention was to develop a knot that would hold well when the constricted object was cut close to the winds of the knot.

The boa knot is related to the strangle knot and the double constrictor knot.  It combines both the structure and qualities of these other two knots. The boa knot can be very difficult to untie and is inappropriate when frequent or fast untying is needed. The knotted part needs to lie over a convex surface to hold.

Start with making two loops that spiral upwards in a clockwise manner. Pull the top end of the rope along the path of the loops until it is parallel to the bottom end. If done correctly, there should be a total of 2.5 loops with both rope ends sticking out. Using both hands, pinch the loops at the sides where the ends hanging out. There should be 3 parts of rope pressed together in each hand. Take each end and twist clockwise until an infinity symbol is formed. Fold the ends of the twisted loops together such that the loose ends are between them. Place in the loops the desired object and pull the loose ends away from it, carefully shaping the knot. This should tighten the loops to the point where they cling firmly to the desired object, yielding the boa knot. Said knot is hard to move around. 
The boa knot is best used for securing objects in cylindrical loads.

See also
 List of knots

References

External links
 http://notableknotindex.webs.com/boaconstrictor.html
 http://www.asiteaboutnothing.net/cr_constrictor.html

Knots of modern origin